

Early bishops
The following list is based on the records of the Chronicle of Edessa (to c.540) and the Chronicle of Zuqnin.

Jacobite (Syriac) bishops
These bishops belonged to the Syriac Orthodox Church. During the later period there were also Byzantine rite bishops alongside them.

Armenian bishops
These bishops belonged to the Armenian church. They ruled alongside Jacobite, Byzantine and Latin bishops.

Latin archbishops
In the first half of the twelfth century, during the period of the Crusades and the county of Edessa, there was a Latin rite archdiocese based in the city. It seems to have displaced the Byzantine bishop, but ruled alongside the Jacobite and Armenian bishops. From the 13th century on, titular bishops were sometimes appointed.

Resident bishops

Titular bishops

References 
The Chronicle of Edessa
Amir Harrak (editor and translator), The Chronicle of Zuqnin, parts III and IV: A.D. 488-775. Toronto: Pontifical Institute of Mediaeval Studies, 1999. 

Edessa
Bishops
 
Catholic titular sees in Asia
Syria religion-related lists

it:Arcidiocesi di Edessa di Osroene